Master of Men may refer to:

 Spider (pulp fiction), an American pulp-magazine hero, with the by-name Master of Men
 Master of Men (film), a 1933 American drama film
 A Master of Men, a 1918 British silent film